The 2001 IIHF Asian Oceanic U18 Championship was the 18th edition of the IIHF Asian Oceanic U18 Championship. The Division I and Division II tournaments took place between 8 and 11 March 2001 in Seoul, South Korea. The Division I tournament was won by South Korea, who claimed their second title by winning all three of their games and finishing first in the standings. Upon winning the tournament South Korea gained promotion to Division III of the 2002 IIHF World U18 Championships. China and Australia finished second and third respectively.

In the Division II tournament, which was also known as the 2002 Division I Qualification tournament, Mongolia finished first in the standings after winning both of their games against Chinese Taipei and Thailand.

Overview
The Division I tournament began on 8 March 2001 in Seoul, South Korea. New Zealand had gained promotion to Division I after finishing first in the Division II tournament at the 2000 IIHF Asian Oceanic Junior U18 Championship. South Korea won the tournament after winning all three of their games and claimed their second title, their first coming in 1998. Following their win South Korea gained promotion for the following year to Division III of the 2002 IIHF World U18 Championships. China finished second after losing their game to South Korea and Australia finished third on losing on goal difference to China after both teams finished on the same number of points. New Zealand who finished last were set to be relegated to Division II for the 2002 IIHF Asian Oceanic U18 Championship however due to a format change both divisions were merged into one tournament for the 2002 competition. Park Chul Ho of South Korea finished as the top scorer for the tournament with ten points including six goals and four assists.

The Division II tournament began on 9 March 2001 in Seoul, South Korea and was officially known as the 2002 IIHF Asian Oceanic U18 Championship Division I Qualification. Mongolia won the tournament after winning both of their games against Chinese Taipei and Thailand. Chinese Taipei finished in second after winning their game against Thailand. Thailand who finished last also suffered the largest defeat of the tournament, losing to Mongolia 1 – 12. Mongolia gained promotion to Division I for the 2002 tournament however due to a format change all teams from Division II were merged into a single competition with the Division I teams for the 2002 IIHF Asian Oceanic U18 Championship. Bold Munktulga of Mongolia finished as the top scorer for the tournament with seven points including five goals and two assists.

Division I

Standings

Fixtures
All times local.

Scoring leaders
List shows the top ten skaters sorted by points, then goals.

Leading goaltenders
Only the top five goaltenders, based on save percentage, who have played 40% of their team's minutes are included in this list.

Division II

Standings

Fixtures
All times local.

Scoring leaders
List shows the top ten skaters sorted by points, then goals.

Leading goaltenders
Only the top goaltenders, based on save percentage, who have played 40% of their team's minutes are included in this list.

References

External links
International Ice Hockey Federation

Iihf Asian Oceanic Junior U18 Championship, 2001
IIHF Asian Oceanic U18 Championship
IIHF Asian Oceanic U18 Championships
International ice hockey competitions hosted by South Korea
Asian